A partial lunar eclipse took place on Monday, March 24, 1997, the first of two lunar eclipses in 1997.

This partial lunar eclipse was nearly total; however, it occurred 3 days after the lunar apogee, so the umbral shadow is smaller.

This was the 29th member of Lunar Saros 132, and the last of the first set of partial eclipses. The next event was the April 2015 lunar eclipse, which was the first of 12 total eclipses.

This eclipse was the third of an almost tetrad (that occurred when there were 4 consecutive lunar eclipses that had an umbral eclipse magnitude of 0.9 or greater). The others were 04 Apr 1996 (T), 27 Sep 1996 (T) and 16 Sep 1997 (T).

Visibility 

This eclipse was completely visible from North and South America, and visible setting over Western Europe and Africa.

Related eclipses

Eclipses of 1997 
 A total solar eclipse on March 9.
 A partial lunar eclipse on March 24.
 A partial solar eclipse on September 2.
 A total lunar eclipse on September 16.

Lunar year series 
This was the third of four lunar year eclipses at the ascending node of the moon's orbit.

The lunar year series repeats after 12 lunations or 354 days (Shifting back about 10 days in sequential years). Because of the date shift, the Earth's shadow will be about 11 degrees west in sequential events.

Saros series

Inex series

Tritos series 
 Preceded: Lunar eclipse of April 24, 1986

 Followed: Lunar eclipse of February 21, 2008

Tzolkinex 
 Preceded: Lunar eclipse of February 9, 1990

 Followed: Lunar eclipse of May 4, 2004

Half-Saros cycle
A lunar eclipse will be preceded and followed by solar eclipses by 9 years and 5.5 days (a half saros). This lunar eclipse is related to two total solar eclipses of Solar Saros 139.

Gallery

See also 
List of lunar eclipses
List of 20th-century lunar eclipses

Notes

External links 
 
 Photos
 Dave Lane's March 24, 1997 Lunar Eclipse Movies and Images
 March 24, 1997 Partial Lunar Eclipse, Bill Pearce
 THE 1997 MARCH 23-24 PARTIAL LUNAR ECLIPSE, CALWELL LUNAR OBSERVATORY
 Lunar Eclipse of March 24, 1997, James Funkhouser
 The 91% eclipsed moon on March 23-24, 1997

1997-03
1997 in science
March 1997 events